The 2009–10 Florida Gators men's basketball team represented the University of Florida in the sport of basketball during the 2009–10 college basketball season.  The Gators competed in Division I of the National Collegiate Athletic Association (NCAA) and the Eastern Division of the Southeastern Conference (SEC).  They were led by head coach Billy Donovan, and played their home games in the O'Connell Center on the university's Gainesville, Florida campus.

The Gators finished the season 21–13, 9–7 in SEC play.  They advanced to the quarterfinals of the 2010 SEC men's basketball tournament before losing to Mississippi State.  They received an at–large bid to the NCAA tournament, their first appearance since their 2006–07 National Championship season, where they earned a No. 10 seed in the West Region.  They were defeated in the first round by No. 7 seed BYU in double overtime.

Class of 2009

|-
| colspan="7" style="padding-left:10px;" | Overall Recruiting Rankings:     Scout – 17     Rivals – 6       ESPN – 20 
|}

Roster

Coaches

Schedule and results
Retrieved from Gatorzone.com

|-
!colspan=8| Exhibition

|-
!colspan=8| Non-conference season

|-
!colspan=8| SEC conference play
|-

|-
!colspan=8| SEC tournament

|-

|-
!colspan=8| NCAA tournament

|-
| colspan="8" | *Non-Conference Game. Rankings from AP poll. All times are in Eastern Time. Tournament seedings in parenthesis.
|}

Rankings

References 

Florida Gators men's basketball seasons
Florida
Florida Gators men's basketball team
Florida Gators men's basketball team
Florida